Ilyinsky District is the name of several administrative and municipal districts in Russia:
Ilyinsky District, Ivanovo Oblast, an administrative and municipal district of Ivanovo Oblast
Ilyinsky District, Perm Krai, an administrative and municipal district of Perm Krai

See also
Ilyinsky (disambiguation)

References